Lamon was a town on the south coast of ancient Crete. According to the Stadiasmus Maris Magni, it had a harbour and was located 150 stadia from Psychea and 30 stadia from Apollonia.

The site of Lamon is tentatively located near modern Ag. Georgios, Plakias.

References

Populated places in ancient Crete
Former populated places in Greece